Jovan Blagojević (born 15 March 1988) is a Serbian professional footballer who plays as a midfielder for Bosnian Premier League club Velež Mostar.

Honours
Željezničar
Bosnian Cup: 2017–18

References

External links
Jovan Blagojević at Sofascore

1988 births
Living people
Footballers from Belgrade
Serbian footballers
Serbian expatriate footballers
Expatriate footballers in Bosnia and Herzegovina
Expatriate footballers in Turkey
Serbian First League players
Premier League of Bosnia and Herzegovina players
TFF First League players
FK Čukarički players
FK Srem players
FK Sinđelić Beograd players
FK Velež Mostar players
FK Željezničar Sarajevo players
Ankaraspor footballers
Association football midfielders